Fred Kaplan may refer to:

Fred Kaplan (biographer) (born 1937), American biographer
Fred Kaplan (bridge) American bridge player
Fred Kaplan (journalist) (born 1954), American journalist who specializes in international affairs and jazz music

See also
Frederick Kaplan, American physician and medical researcher
Fred H. Caplan (1914–2004), West Virginia Supreme Court Justice